The women's 3 m springboard competition of the diving events at the 2012 European Aquatics Championships was held on May 19.

Medalists

Results
The preliminary round was held at 11:00 local time. The final was held at 17:30.

Green denotes finalists

References 

2012 European Aquatics Championships